Lynda McDonald Applegate is an American economist, currently the Baker Foundation Professor at Harvard Business School.

Selected publications

References 

Year of birth missing (living people)
Living people
Harvard Business School faculty
Place of birth missing (living people)
American women economists
21st-century American economists
21st-century American educators
Information systems researchers
21st-century American women